The William B. Holden House is a house located in southeast Portland, Oregon listed on the National Register of Historic Places. The property was deemed significant for its architecture, for its landscape architecture, and for its association with the life of Dr. W. B. Holden (1873–1955). The house was designed by architect Roscoe Hememway. The landscape architecture was designed by John Alexander Grant. The property included a rose garden.

The listing for the William B. Holden House was for a  property located at 6347 Southeast Yamhill, that consisted of the entire tax lot of Lot I, Belmont Villa, Portland, Oregon.
 
In 2016, the National Register recorded a boundary decrease listing with address 6353 SE Yamhill, with property name William R. Holden House.  This appears to indicate that the 6347 property has been split, and the original .75 acre property is no longer intact.  Further the middle initial appears to indicate a typo;  the listing would have made sense as a boundary decrease to the William B. Holden House listing.

See also
 National Register of Historic Places listings in Southeast Portland, Oregon

Notes

References

1929 establishments in Oregon
Houses completed in 1929
Houses on the National Register of Historic Places in Portland, Oregon
Mount Tabor, Portland, Oregon
Portland Historic Landmarks
Tudor Revival architecture in Oregon